Michel Lysight (born 1958) is a Belgian-Canadian composer.

Career 
Born in Brussels, after two years of study in art history, Lysight entered the Conservatoire royal de Bruxelles where he obtained the first prizes in music history, music theory, psycho-pedagogy, harmony, counterpoint, fugue and bassoon. He also holds advanced degrees in music theory and chamber music.

Quatrain for wind quartet won the 1990  from the Académie Royale des Beaux-Arts. The Silver Medal with mention from the Académie Internationale de Lutèce (Paris) was awarded to him in 1992 on the occasion of its international composition competition. The Union of Belgian Composers awarded him the 1997 Trophée Fuga for his work in favor of the national repertoire.

The influence of musicians such as Steve Reich, John Adams, Arvo Pärt and Henryk Górecki is felt in his music and makes him one of the leading figures of the  current in Belgium. Lysight is a member of the SABAM, the Union of Belgian Composers, and the Belgian Centre for Music Documentation. His catalogue contains about a hundred works, many of which are recorded on discs.

Lysight is a professor at the Royal Conservatory of Brussels and at the Academies of Schaerbeek and Brussels. He regularly gives lectures on contemporary music, chairs the jury of the Kaufmann European Music Competition and has been a visiting professor at the Bilkent University in Ankara.

Works 
Chronographie VIII for viola (or cello) and piano (2004); Alain Van Kerckhoven Éditeur; CeBeDeM
Homage to Fibonacci for 2 violas (2004); Éditions Delatour; CeBeDeM
Meditation for viola and guitar (or harp, or harpsichord, or marimba, or piano) (2009); Alain Van Kerckhoven Éditeur
Samarkand for viola (or clarinet) and piano (or string quartet) (1992, 1995); Alain Van Kerckhoven Éditeur
Septentrion for viola (or clarinet) and piano, or string quartet, or string orchestra (2005); Éditions Delatour; CeBeDeM
Thrène for viola (or violin, or cello) and piano (1995); Alain Van Kerckhoven Éditeur
Trois Croquis for viola (or violin, or cello) and piano (1990); Alain Van Kerckhoven Éditeur

References

External links
 Michel Lysight official website
 New Consonant Music
 Michel Lysight, de la dérive des sentiments on ResMusica
 

1958 births
Living people
People from Uccle
Musicians from Brussels
Belgian composers
Male composers
Belgian male musicians
Royal Conservatory of Brussels alumni
Academic staff of the Royal Conservatory of Brussels